Tzimon Barto (born Johnny Barto Smith, 2 January 1963 in Eustis, Florida) is an American classical pianist. He is also a bodybuilder, novelist, poet, philosopher and speaks seven languages. He is best known for his work with Christoph Eschenbach of the National Symphony Orchestra, who discovered Barto in 1988.

References

External links
Official site
Interview with Tzimon Barto, May 23, 1996

American classical pianists
Male classical pianists
American male pianists
1963 births
Living people
People from Eustis, Florida
20th-century American pianists
21st-century classical pianists
20th-century American male musicians
21st-century American male musicians
21st-century American pianists